The Christian Reformer, or New Evangelical Miscellany was a British Unitarian magazine established in 1815 and edited by Robert Aspland.

The Christian Reformer was published monthly until 1863 and a different Unitarian journal appeared during 1886-1887 with the same title.

References

1815 establishments in the United Kingdom
Religious magazines published in the United Kingdom
Christian magazines
Defunct magazines published in the United Kingdom
Magazines established in 1815
Unitarianism in the United Kingdom
Magazines with year of disestablishment missing